Thomas von Nathusius (Althaldensleben 1866 – Stettin 1904) was a German landscape and animal painter. The youngest son of Heinrich von Nathusius, he was grandson to Johann Gottlob Nathusius, nephew to Hermann von Nathusius and first cousin to the portrait painter Susanne von Nathusius. His paintings of animals were used to illustrate a four-volume atlas of the races and forms of domesticated animals, in collaboration with his brother Simon von Nathusius.

Works 

 Atlas der Rassen und Formen unserer Haustiere: Nach Originalzeichnungen von Tiermaler Th. von Nathusius; 1: Die Pferderassen. Stuttgart: Eugen Ulmer 1904
 Atlas der Rassen und Formen unserer Haustiere: Nach Originalzeichnungen von Tiermaler Th. von Nathusius; 2: Die Rinderassen. Stuttgart: Eugen Ulmer 1904
 Atlas der Rassen und Formen unserer Haustiere: Nach Originalzeichnungen von Tiermaler Th. von Nathusius; 3: Die Schweinerassen, die Schafrassen, die Ziegenrassen Stuttgart: Eugen Ulmer 1904
 Atlas der Rassen und Formen unserer Haustiere: Nach Originalzeichnungen von Tiermaler Th. von Nathusius; 4: Verschiedenheiten der Formen, verursacht durch Variabilität, Gebrauchszweck, Aufzucht, Alter, Geschlecht usw. Stuttgart: Eugen Ulmer 1906

References 

19th-century German painters
19th-century German male artists
German male painters
20th-century German painters
20th-century German male artists
1866 births
1904 deaths